Sphex jamaicensis is a species of thread-waisted wasp in the family Sphecidae. It is found in Florida, Cuba (including Isla de la Juventud), The Bahamas, and Jamaica.

ITIS Taxonomic notes:
Sphex jamaicensis (Drury, 1773) (originally in Vespa) is apparently a senior secondary homonym of Sphex jamaicensis Fabricius, 1775 (though these two have apparently never been treated as congeneric).
Sphex jamaicensis Fabricius, 1775 is apparently a junior secondary homonym of Sphex jamaicensis (Drury, 1773) (originally in Vespa) (though these two have apparently never been treated as congeneric).

References

Further reading

External links

 

Sphecidae
Insects described in 1773
Taxa named by Dru Drury

Hymenoptera of North America
Insects of the Caribbean